Cacaloxtepec Mixtec, also Huajuapan Mixtec, is a Mixtec language spoken in the town of Santiago Cacaloxtepec in Oaxaca, Mexico. It is most intelligible with Silacayoapan Mixtec.

References 

Mixtec language